Shaun MacDonald or McDonald may refer to:
Shaun MacDonald (born 1988), Welsh footballer
Shaun MacDonald (footballer, born 1996), English footballer
Shaun MacDonald (rugby union) (born 1994), Scottish rugby union player
Shaun McDonald (born 1981), American football player
Shaun McDonald (darts player) (born 1985), Scottish darts player
Shaun McDonald (rugby union) (born 1989), South African rugby union player

See also
Shauna MacDonald (disambiguation)
Shawn McDonald (born 1977), American musician